Vrábče is a municipality and village in České Budějovice District in the South Bohemian Region of the Czech Republic. It has about 800 inhabitants.

Administrative parts
Villages of Koroseky, Kroclov and Slavče are administrative parts of Vrábče.

References

Villages in České Budějovice District